Stephanie Enright (born December 15, 1990), nicknamed Fefa, is a Puerto Rican volleyball player who currently plays for Italian club AGIL Novara of the Serie A1. She is the cousin of Michael Nieves. She is a member of the Puerto Rico women's national volleyball team since 2009. Enright made her debut with the national team at the 2009 Women's NORCECA Volleyball Championship that was held in Bayamón, Puerto Rico. She was part of the Puerto Rican national team at the 2014 FIVB Volleyball Women's World Championship in Italy and at the 2016 Olympic Games in Rio de Janeiro.

Clubs
  Toray Arrows (2012–2013)
  Criollas de Caguas (2014–2016)
  Azerrail Baku (2015–2016)
  Il Bisonte Firenze (2016–2017)
  Novara (2018 - 2020)

  turkey team (2019-2020)

  Puerto Rico (2021)

Awards

Club
 2015–2016 Azerbaijan Super League –  Champion, with Azerrail Baku

References

1990 births
Living people
Puerto Rican women's volleyball players
Volleyball players at the 2015 Pan American Games
Pan American Games competitors for Puerto Rico
Place of birth missing (living people)
Volleyball players at the 2016 Summer Olympics
Wing spikers
Expatriate volleyball players in Japan
Expatriate volleyball players in Azerbaijan
American expatriate sportspeople in Azerbaijan
Expatriate volleyball players in Italy
Summer Olympics competitors for Puerto Rico
Serie A1 (women's volleyball) players